Rudolf Resch (7 April 1914 – 11 July 1943) was a German Luftwaffe military aviator during the Spanish Civil War and World War II, a fighter ace listed with 94 enemy aircraft shot down. A flying ace or fighter ace is a military aviator credited with shooting down five or more enemy aircraft during aerial combat. He was credited with one aerial during the Spanish Civil War and further 93 on the Eastern Front of World War II.

Born in Kamenz, Resch volunteered for service with the Condor Legion during the Spanish Civil War where he was assigned to Jagdgruppe 88 (J/88—88th Fighter Group). Following service in Spain, Resch was posted to Jagdgeschwader 77 (JG 77—77th Fighter Wing) and became a Staffelkapitän (squadron leader). Serving in the Battle of France and Battle of Britain, he was then transferred to Jagdgeschwader 52 (JG 52—52nd Fighter Wing). He claimed his first aerial victory of World War II on 22 June 1941, the day German forces launched Operation Barbarossa, the invasion of the Soviet Union. On 6 September 1942, Resch was awarded the Knight's Cross of the Iron Cross after 58 aerial victories claimed in World War II.

Resch was appointed Gruppenkommandeur (group commander) of IV. Gruppe (4th group) of Jagdgeschwader 51 "Mölders" (JG 51—51st Fighter Wing) on 1 March 1943. He was killed in action on 11 July 1943, when he was shot down near Oryol during the Battle of Kursk.

Early life and career
Resch was born on 7 April 1914 in Kamenz, at the time in the Kingdom of Saxony, part of the German Empire. His father was a professor of Slavic studies at the Dresden University of Technology. In early 1938, he joined the Condor Legion and was posted to 2. Staffel (2nd squadron) of Jagdgruppe 88 (J/88—88th Fighter Group) as a fighter pilot. On 17 July, he claimed an aerial victory over a Polikarpov I-15 fighter aircraft. On 14 April 1939, he was awarded the Spanish Cross in Gold with Swords, for his service in the Spanish Civil War. Following his return to Germany, he served as an instructor at the Jagdfliegerschule Schleißheim, the fighter pilot school at Schleißheim.

World War II
World War II in Europe began on Friday 1 September 1939 when German forces invaded Poland. Resch was appointed Staffelkapitän (squadron leader) of 3. Staffel of Jagdgeschwader 77 (JG 77—77th Fighter Wing) in April 1940 during the "Phoney War" period of World War II. He replaced Oberleutnant Werner Eichel. The Staffel belonged to I. Gruppe (1st group) of JG 77, at the time based in Odendorf, preparing for the upcoming Battle of France. During the Battle of Britain on 31 August, Resch made a forced landing in his Messerschmitt Bf 109 E-1 (Werknummer 3642—factory number) following aerial combat with the Royal Air Force (RAF) over the Thames Estuary.

On 6 October 1940, Resch was transferred and made Staffelkapitän of 6. Staffel of Jagdgeschwader 52 (JG 52—52nd Fighter Wing). He replaced Oberleutnant Werner Lederer in this function who was transferred. The Staffel was subordinated to II. Gruppe of JG 52 which was headed by Hauptmann Wilhelm Ensslen. In consequence, command of his former 3. Staffel of JG 77 passed on to Oberleutnant Karl-Gottfried Nordmann. At the time, the Gruppe was based at Peuplingues near the English Channel and fighting the RAF during the Battle of Britain. II. Gruppe was withdrawn from the Channel Front on 2 November and moved to München Gladbach, present-day Mönchengladbach, on 5 November for a period of rest and replenishment.  The Gruppe had also lost its commanding officer, Ensslen, who was killed in action on 2 November. Ensslen was replaced by Hauptmann Erich Woitke. On 22 December, II. Gruppe was ordered to Leeuwarden Airfield where they were tasked with flying fighter patrols along the Dutch North Sea coast. On 15 January 1941, the Gruppe moved to Ypenburg Airfield where they stayed until 10 February.

Operation Barbarossa

In preparation of Operation Barbarossa, the German invasion of the Soviet Union, II. Gruppe of JG 52, without a period of replenishment in Germany, was ordered to airfields close to the German-Soviet demarcation line. While the Gruppenstab (group headquarters unit) and 4. Staffel were based at Suwałki in northeastern Poland, 5. and 6. Staffel were transferred to a forward airfield at Sobolewo. For the invasion, II. Gruppe of JG 52 was subordinated to the Geschwaderstab (headquarters unit) of Jagdgeschwader 27 (JG 27—27th Fighter Wing). The Geschwader was part of the VIII. Fliegerkorps commanded by Generaloberst Wolfram Freiherr von Richthofen which supported the northern wing of Army Group Centre.

On 22 June, the German forces launched the attack on the Soviet Union which opened the Eastern Front. That day, Resch claimed his first aerial victory of World War II. He was credited with shooting down a Tupolev SB-2 bomber in the afternoon. On 25 June, the Gruppe moved to an airfield at Varėna in Lithuania which had previously been occupied by the Soviet Air Forces (VVS—Voyenno-Vozdushnye Sily). Two days later, the Gruppe moved to Maladzyechna, supporting the advance Panzergruppe 3 near Barysaw. Flying from this airfield, Resch claimed an Ilyushin DB-3 bomber shot down on 2 July. Two days later, the Gruppe moved to Sloboda, east of Minsk, before moving to an airfield named Lepel-West at Lyepyel on 5 July. From this airfield, II. Gruppe flew combat air patrols and fighter escort missions to combat areas near Vitebsk and Haradok, supporting Panzergruppe 2 and 3 in their advance to Vitebsk and Polotsk. Here, Resch claimed the destruction of a SB-3 bomber on 7 July. On 12 July, the Gruppe moved to Kamary, an airfield in the western parts of Vitebsk. Resch shot down a SB-2 bomber on 17 July. On 22 July, II. Gruppe advanced to the airfield Andrejewka near Smolensk where it stayed until 5 August. Operating from Andrejewka, Resch shot down another SB-2 bomber on 27 July.

II. Here, the Gruppe supported the fighting south of Lake Ilmen, and the German attacks on Shlisselburg, Leningrad and the Soviet fleet at Kronstadt. Operating from Soltsy, Resch claimed one Mikoyan-Gurevich MiG-1 fighter shot down on 16 and 19 August. On 24 August, II. Gruppe was ordered to an airfield at Spasskaya Polist on the river Polist, south of Chudovo and north of Novgorod on Lake Ilmen, supporting the 18th Army in its advance towards the Neva and Lake Ladoga. Resch claimed three MiG-1 fighters while flying from Spasskaya Polist, one on 25 August and two the following day. Since German forces had reached the proximity of Leningrad, II. The Gruppe stayed at Lyuban until 30 September, flying missions to Shlisselburg, Leningrad and Mga. Fighting in this combat area, Resch claimed six aerial victories in September 1941. On 2 September, he was credited with the destruction of a MiG-1 fighter followed by a Polikarpov R-5 reconnaissance bomber on 5 September followed by another MiG-1 fighter on 11 September. The following day, he claimed another MiG-1 fighter, followed by two further MiG-1 fighters shot down on 26 and 27 September.

On 2 October, German forces launched Operation Typhoon, the failed strategic offensive to capture Moscow. In support of this offensive, II. Gruppe was moved to Stabna, located just north of Smolensk. On 12 October, II. Gruppe was ordered to Novodugino where it stayed for four days. The Gruppe then moved to an airfield west of Kalinin, present-day Tver, on 16 October. The following day, Resch claimed two MiG-1 fighters and two DB-3 bombers on 18 October. These were his last claims in 1941. He was awarded the Honour Goblet of the Luftwaffe on 20 December 1941.

Eastern Front
In late January 1942, II. Gruppe was withdrawn from the Eastern Front and sent to Jesau near Königsberg for a period of recuperation and replenishment, arriving on 24 January 1942. In Jesau, the Gruppe received many factory new Bf 109 F-4 aircraft. On 14 April, II. Gruppe received orders to move to Pilsen, present-day Plzeň in the Czech Republic, for relocation to the Eastern Front. The Gruppe had also received a new commander, Woitke had been transferred and was replaced by Hauptmann Johannes Steinhoff who thus became Resch's commanding officer. Following a series of relocations, including a short deployment on the Crimea where Resch claimed an Ilyushin Il-2 ground attack aircraft on 8 May. The Gruppe was then ordered to the airfield named Kharkov-Waitschenko on 14 May and participated in the Second Battle of Kharkov. The next day, Resch was credited with shooting down a Polikarpov I-153 fighter. On 16 May, the Gruppe moved to Artyomovsk, present-day Bakhmut, where they stayed until 23 May supporting German forces fighting in the Second Battle of Kharkov. Operating from Artyomovsk, Resch shot down a MiG-1 fighter on 20 May, and one on 21 and 22 May each. On 23 May, the Gruppe was ordered to relocate to Barvinkove. There, Resch claimed a Vultee V-11 attack aircraft and a Petlyakov Pe-2 bomber on 26 May.

On 1 June, II. Gruppe moved to an airfield at Grakowo, located approximately halfway between Kharkov and Kupiansk. The main German objectives in that combat area were, breakthrough to the upper Don and capture of Voronezh. Resch claimed the destruction of an Il-2 ground attack aircraft that day. On 10 June, he was credited with two aerial victories, a further Il-2 aircraft, and a MiG-1 fighter. Three days later, he claimed two Lavochkin-Gorbunov-Gudkov LaGG-3 fighters destroyed. Flying Bf 109 F-4/R1 (Werknummer 13358), Resch was wounded in combat on 21 June near Sochorowka. On 14 July, II. Gruppe again relocated, this time south to Chatzepetowka, and then on 17 July to Taganrog located on the Sea of Azov. There, Resch shot down a LaGG-3 fighter on 19 July, and two further LaGG-3 fighters the following day. On 22 July, II. Gruppe moved to an airfield named Nowy-Cholan, south of Tatsinskaya, where the Gruppe flew combat air patrols. There, Resch claimed a Sukhoi Su-2 aircraft shot down on 24 July. The next day, he claimed an I-153 fighter, an I-16 fighter and a LaGG-3 fighter. For 40 aerial victories claimed to date, he was awarded the German Cross in Gold on 27 July 1942.

Following several relocations, II. Gruppe was ordered to Tusov on 20 August. Until end of August, Resch claimed ten further aerial victories. He shot down a LaGG-3 fighter on 23 August, the next day he claimed a Mikoyan-Gurevich MiG-3 fighter. On 25 August, a Yakovlev Yak-1 fighter and LaGG-3 fighter fell to his guns, followed by one LaGG-3 fighter on 26, 27, 28, 29, 30 and 31 August, respectively. Resch was awarded the Knight's Cross of the Iron Cross on 6 September 1942 for 50 aerial victories claimed.

Group commander
Resch was appointed Gruppenkommandeur (group commander) of IV. Gruppe of Jagdgeschwader 51 "Mölders" (JG 51—51st Fighter Wing) on 1 March 1943. He replaced Hauptmann Johann Knauth who was transferred. Command of his former 6. Staffel of JG 52 was passed on to Oberleutnant Gustav Denk. His three squadron leaders were, Oberleutnant Horst-Günther von Fassong heading 10. Staffel, Hauptmann Adolf Borchers in charge of 11. Staffel, and Hauptmann Wilhelm Moritz leading 12. Staffel. The Gruppe had just completed conversion from the Bf 109 F-2 to the Focke Wulf Fw 190 A-4 and was based at Smolensk. In that combat area, Army Group Centre had launched Operation Büffel, a series of retreats eliminating the Rzhev salient. On 21 March, IV. Gruppe was ordered to Bryansk where it was deployed over the left wing of Army Group Centre. On 23 March, Resch claimed his first aerial victory as Gruppenkommandeur when he shot down a LaGG-3 fighter northeast of Zhizdra.

On the afternoon of 11 April, IV. Gruppe escorted 16 Junkers Ju 87 dive bombers from III. Gruppe of Sturzkampfgeschwader 1 (StG 1—1st Dive Bomber Wing) on a bombing mission to various targets near Kursk. On this mission, Resch claimed two LaGG-3 fighters shot down north of Kursk. The Gruppe flew missions to the combat area south and southeast of Oryol on 25 April. That day, Resch claimed a MiG-3 fighter shot down. The following day, the Gruppe was ordered to the airfield named Sjablowo, a satellite airfield near Oryol. On 7 May, large Soviet bomber and ground attack aircraft units attacked Luftwaffe airfields in the area of Oryol and Bryansk. Defending against this attack, Resch was credited with destruction of an Il-2 ground attack aircraft. Resch was then credited with shooting down a Yak-1 fighter east of Verkhovye on 11 May. The following day, he claimed a LaGG-3 shot down south Oryol, the only claim by IV. Gruppe that day. On 2 June, IV. Gruppe flew escort missions and combat air patrols to Kursk. Without loss, IV. Gruppe pilots claimed 13 aerial victories, including two LaGG-3 fighters by Resch. Combat on 8 June, led the Gruppe to an area east and southeast of Oryol. On two separate missions, Resch shot down a LaGG-3 fighter in the morning and a La-5 fighter later that evening.

Operation Citadel and death

On 5 July, German forces launched Operation Citadel in a failed attempt to eliminate the Kursk salient that initiated the Battle of Kursk. In preparation of this operation, IV. Gruppe was ordered to an airfield named Oryol-West and supported Generaloberst Walter Model's 9th Army on the northern pincer. That day, pilots of the Gruppe flew up to five combat missions in the combat area near Maloarkhangelsk. The Gruppe escorted bombers from Kampfgeschwader 4 (KG 4—4th Bomber Wing), KG 51 and KG 53 as well as Ju 87 dive bombers from StG 1. The Gruppe claimed 36 aerial victories that day, including two La-5 fighters by Resch, one northeast of Maloarkhangelsk and another south-southeast of Trosna.

In the early morning of 6 July, Resch shot down Leytnant Yevgeniy Stepanov from the 157 IAP (Fighter Aviation Regiment—Istrebitelny Aviatsionny Polk). On 8 July, the Gruppe flew multiple missions in support of the Army near Ponyri as well as escort missions for Ju 87 dive bombers from StG 1. In their defense, Resch shot down a Yak-1 fighter west of Livny and a La-5 fighter west of Maloarkhangelsk. The next day, the 9th Army was fighting near Olkhovatka and Ponyri. The Gruppe claimed 24 aerial victories, including a LaGG-3 fighter and an Il-2 ground attack aircraft by Resch. On 11 July, Resch claimed another Il-2 ground attack aircraft. He was then shot down and killed in action in his Fw 190 A-5 (Werknummer 7264) near Judinka, the combat area near Maloarkhangelsk. He was succeeded by Major Hans-Ekkehard Bob as commander of IV. Gruppe.

Summary of career

Aerial victory claims
According to US historian David T. Zabecki, Resch was credited with 93 aerial victories during World War II. Spick lists Resch with 94 aerial victories claimed in an unknown number combat missions. This figure includes 93 aerial victories on the Eastern Front, and one further victory during the Spanish Civil War. Mathews and Foreman, authors of Luftwaffe Aces — Biographies and Victory Claims, researched the German Federal Archives and found documentation for 93 aerial victory claims. This number includes one claim during the Spanish Civil War and 65 on the Eastern Front.

Victory claims were logged to a map-reference (PQ = Planquadrat), for example "PQ 44243". These sectors were then subdivided into 36 smaller units to give a location area 3 × 4 km in size.

Awards
 Spanish Cross in Gold with Swords (14 April 1939)
 Honour Goblet of the Luftwaffe on 20 December 1941 as Hauptmann and Staffelkapitän
 German Cross in Gold on 27 July 1942 as Hauptmann in the 6./Jagdgeschwader 52
 Knight's Cross of the Iron Cross on 6 September 1942 as Hauptmann and Staffelkapitän of the 5./Jagdgeschwader 52

Notes

References

Citations

Bibliography

External links
Luftwaffe 1939–1945 History
TracesOfWar.com

1914 births
1943 deaths
People from Kamenz
People from the Kingdom of Saxony
Luftwaffe pilots
German World War II flying aces
German military personnel of the Spanish Civil War
Recipients of the Gold German Cross
Recipients of the Knight's Cross of the Iron Cross
Luftwaffe personnel killed in World War II
Aviators killed by being shot down
Condor Legion personnel
Military personnel from Saxony